Medicine Show is the second studio album by The Dream Syndicate. It was released in 1984.

The Dream Syndicate left Slash Records, a small label that released the band's first album The Days of Wine and Roses (1982), and signed with the A&M label. Medicine Show was produced by Sandy Pearlman; Pearlman had previously worked with Blue Öyster Cult and The Clash.

Track listing
All songs written by Steve Wynn except where noted.
"Still Holding on to You" – 3:39
"Daddy's Girl" – 3:02
"Burn" – 5:34
"Armed with an Empty Gun" – 3:56
"Bullet with My Name on It" (Karl Precoda) – 6:20
"The Medicine Show" – 6:29
"John Coltrane Stereo Blues" – 8:48
"Merrittville" – 7:20

Personnel
Steve Wynn – guitar, vocals
Karl Precoda – lead, rhythm guitars
Dennis Duck – drums
Dave Provost – bass
Additional musicians:
Tom Zvoncheck –  piano, Hammond B3 organ
Sid Griffin – background vocals
Stephen McCarthy – background vocals
Paul Mandl – background vocals
Gavin Blair – background vocals

References

The Dream Syndicate albums
1984 albums
A&M Records albums
Albums produced by Sandy Pearlman